Pyotr Ilyich Tchaikovsky's String Quartet No. 1 in D major Op. 11 was the first of his three completed string quartets that were published during his lifetime. An earlier attempt had been abandoned after the first movement was completed.

Composed in February 1871, it was premiered in Moscow on 16/28 March 1871 by four members of the Russian Musical Society: Ferdinand Laub and Ludvig Minkus, violins; Pryanishnikov, viola; and Wilhelm Fitzenhagen, cello. Tchaikovsky arranged the second movement for cello and string orchestra in 1888.

Structure

The quartet has four movements:

Second movement - Andante cantabile 
The melancholic second movement, which has become famous in its own right, was based on a folk song the composer heard at his sister's house at Kamenka whistled by a house painter.

Leo Tolstoy
When the quartet was performed at a tribute concert for Leo Tolstoy, the author was said to have been brought to tears by this movement: “…Tolstoy, sitting next to me and listening to the Andante of my First Quartet, burst into tears".

Helen Keller
When the Zoellner Quartet, at her request, performed the second movement for Helen Keller, who rested her fingertips on a resonant tabletop to sense the vibrations, she, too, reacted strongly. She quickly sensed the musical vibrations, swaying in time, alternately crying and smiling. Afterward, Keller reacted as follows:

Other occurrences
The melody from second theme of the Andante cantabile, in D major, was used as the basis for the popular song "On the Isle of May", popularized by Connee Boswell in 1940. This movement ends with plagal cadence.

Footnotes

External links
 
Performance of String Quartet No. 1 by the Borromeo String Quartet from the Isabella Stewart Gardner Museum in MP3 format
 Tchaikovsky Research

String Quartet No. 1
Compositions in D major
1871 compositions